Saginaw High School (part of the Saginaw City School District) is located in Saginaw, Michigan, USA. The student enrollment is 593 students.

History
The school was established in 1865 as East Side High School. Alice Freeman Palmer, who later became President of Wellesley College, was principal of the school from 1877 to 1879. In early 2014, there was some debate about closing the school. Many people disliked the idea and instead offered an 8th through 12th grade starting fall of 2014. In the fall of 2024, Saginaw High is scheduled to be closed as a high school, and turned into a middle school for the students on the east side Saginaw. Saginaw High's in city rival school, Arthur Hill will also close and the two schools will get combined for one new school. Declining enrollment and curriculum opportunity are stated as the reasons.

Academics

Saginaw is recognized by NCA (North Central Association of Colleges and Schools) as an accredited public high school.

Demographics

Saginaw High School Profile (2013–14)

Athletics

Saginaw won the Michigan Division 2 football state championship in 1999. The program has endured rough times lately. The program has produced NFL players such as Terry McDaniel, LaMarr Woodley, Charles Rogers, Roy Manning, and Charleston Hughes.This team was coached by Don Durrett. 

Saginaw High has won multiple state championships in basketball. Their most recent state championship victory came in 2012 with a 54-42 win over the Rockford Rams capping a 26-2 season. In 2007, Saginaw Trojans defeated the Detroit Redford Huskies to claim the Class A state championship, the first of back to back state championship teams led by current NBA player, Draymond Green. The Trojans then repeated in 2008, beating the Detroit Pershing Doughboys, to capture another Class A state championship title. Saginaw has also won championships in 1942, 1962, and 1996.

Saginaw has produced NBA players such as Draymond Green, Darvin Ham, and Anthony Roberson.

Saginaw girls' basketball won the state championship in 1986. Alumni include former Michigan State University basketball player Annette Babers and former Howard University Kayette Jones.

Saginaw High School Championships

Football
 Boys Football 1999 – Division 2 State Championship
 Boys Football 1942 – Class A State Championship
 Boys Football 1907 – Mythical Class A State Championship

Boys basketball
 1941 Class A State Runner-Up
 1942 Class A State Championship
 1962 Class A State Championship
 1973 Class A State Runner-Up
 1976 Class A State Runner-Up
 1990 Class A State Runner-Up
 1996 Class A State Championship
 2007 Class A State Championship
 2008 Class A State Championship
 2012 Class A State Championship

Boys Track
 1933 Class A State Runner-up
 1935 Class A State Championship
 1937 Class A State Runner-up
 1938 Class A State Championship
 1945 Class A State Championship
 1946 Class A State Championship
 1947 Class A State Championship
 1948 Class A State Championship
 1949 Class A State Championship
 1952 Class A State Championship
 1954 Class A State Championship
 1972 Class A State Runner-up
 1973 Class A State Championship

Girls basketball
 1986 Class A State State Championship
 1987 Class A State Runner-Up

Notable alumni
 Bob Buhl, former MLB player (Milwaukee Braves, Chicago Cubs, Philadelphia Phillies)
 Draymond Green, NBA player for the Golden State Warriors
 Darvin Ham, played for the Detroit Pistons.
 Charleston Hughes, CFL player for the Calgary Stampeders.
 Roy Manning, former NFL player and current outside linebackers coach at Washington State University
 Terry McDaniel, former Tennessee and NFL football player
 Stacy Erwin Oakes, current State Representative, Michigan House of Representatives, 95th District.
 Calvin O'Neal, former Michigan and NFL football player.
 Shonte Peoples, former Michigan and CFL football player.
 James Reed, former NFL defensive tackle.
 Anthony Roberson, former NBA player
 Charles Rogers, former NFL wide receiver.
 Tom Slade, former Michigan football player
 LaMarr Woodley, former NFL player for Arizona Cardinals.
 Paul Dawkins, first NBA player from Saginaw [Utah Jazz], and international basketball player [Turkey-Galatasaray].
Reggie Jones (sprinter), world class sprinter in the 100 and 200 meter sprints.

See also
 List of schools in Saginaw, Michigan
 List of high schools in Michigan

References

External links
 Saginaw High School official website
 Saginaw Public Schools official website
 North Central Home

Public high schools in Michigan
Schools in Saginaw County, Michigan
Educational institutions established in 1865
1865 establishments in Michigan
Saginaw, Michigan
Saginaw Intermediate School District